Ramaria flavescens is a species of coral fungus in the family Gomphaceae. It was first described as Clavaria flavescens by Jacob Christian Schäffer in 1762; American mycologist Ron Peterson transferred it to the genus Ramaria in 1974. The IUCN Red List labels this species as Critically Endangered in Denmark and as Data Deficient in the Czech Republic.

References

Gomphaceae
Fungi described in 1762
Fungi of Europe
Taxa named by Jacob Christian Schäffer